Ramiro Gonzalo Benavides Saravia (born 30 January 1947) is a former professional tennis player from Bolivia.

Biography
Benavides, who was born in La Paz, received a scholarship to the University Corpus Christi in Texas. He completed a degree in business administration and played collegiate tennis.

He then played professionally, with his best performance on tour coming at the Florence Grand Prix tournament in 1975 when he had a win over world number eight Adriano Panatta and made the semi-finals.

His Davis Cup career for Bolivia spanned 32 years and consisted of eight ties. He first played in 1971 and made what was his last appearance for many years in 1982, but made a comeback in 2003 at the age of 56 to play a doubles match against El Salvador. At the time this made him the second oldest player in Davis Cup history, after Togo's Gadonfin Koptigan Yaka.

Now a tennis coach, Benavides competes regularly on the seniors tennis circuit.

Challenger titles

Doubles: (4)

References

External links
 
 
 

1947 births
Living people
Bolivian male tennis players
Sportspeople from La Paz